Gellar-e Mohammad Taqi (also Romanized as Gellar-e Moḩammad Taqī and Gellar-e Moḩammadtaqī; also known as Gellar-e Taqī) is a village in Meshgin-e Sharqi Rural District, in the Central District of Meshgin Shahr County, Ardabil Province, Iran. At the 2006 census, its population was 118 residents and 30 families.

References 

Towns and villages in Meshgin Shahr County